Hospital 20 de Noviembre is a station on Line 12 of the Mexico City Metro. The station is located between Insurgentes Sur and Zapata. It was opened on 30 October 2012 as part of the first stretch of Line 12 between Mixcoac and Tláhuac.

General information
The station is located south of the city center, at the intersection between Eje 7 Sur Félix Cuevas and Avenida Coyoacán. It is built underground.

The name of the station originates from the nearby hospital, and the station's icon depicts the hospital's distinctive roof structure.

Hospital 20 de Noviembre serves Colonia Del Valle Sur neighborhood.

According to the earlier Line 12 project, this station's planned name was Del Valle.

Ridership

Gallery

References

External links 
 

Hospital 20 de Noviembre
Railway stations opened in 2012
2012 establishments in Mexico
Mexico City Metro stations in Benito Juárez, Mexico City
Accessible Mexico City Metro stations